In a positional numeral system, the radix or base is the number of unique digits, including the digit zero, used to represent numbers. For example, for the decimal system (the most common system in use today) the radix is ten, because it uses the ten digits from 0 through 9.

For example, (100)10 is equivalent to  100 (the decimal system is implied in the latter) and represents the number one hundred, while (100)2 (in the binary system with base 2) represents the number four.

Etymology 
Radix is a Latin word for "root". Root can be considered a synonym for base, in the arithmetical sense.

In numeral systems 
In the system with radix 13, for example, a string of digits such as 398 denotes the (decimal) number  = 632. 

More generally, in a system with radix b, a string of digits  denotes the number , where . In contrast to decimal, or radix 10, which has a ones' place, tens' place, hundreds' place, and so on, radix b would have a ones' place, then a b1s' place, a b2s' place, etc.

Commonly used numeral systems include:

The octal and hexadecimal systems are often used in computing because of their ease as shorthand for binary. Every hexadecimal digit corresponds to a sequence of four binary digits, since sixteen is the fourth power of two; for example, hexadecimal 7816 is binary 2. Similarly, every octal digit corresponds to a unique sequence of three binary digits, since eight is the cube of two.

This representation is unique.  Let b be a positive integer greater than 1.  Then every positive integer a can be expressed uniquely in the form

where m is a nonnegative integer and the r'''s are integers such that

0 < rm < b and 0 ≤ ri < b for i = 0, 1, ... , m − 1.

Radices are usually natural numbers. However, other positional systems are possible, for example, golden ratio base (whose radix is a non-integer algebraic number), and negative base (whose radix is negative).
A negative base allows the representation of negative numbers without the use of a minus sign.  For example, let b'' = −10. Then a string of digits such as 19 denotes the (decimal) number  = −1.

See also
Base (exponentiation)
 Mixed radix
Polynomial
Radix economy
Radix sort
Non-standard positional numeral systems

Notes

References

External links

MathWorld entry on base

Elementary mathematics
Numeral systems